Walter Napleton Stone VC (7 December 1891 – 30 November 1917) was an English recipient of the Victoria Cross, the highest and most prestigious award for gallantry in the face of the enemy that can be awarded to British and Commonwealth forces. He was born in Blackheath, London.

Details
Born on 7 December 1891 to Edward and Emily Frances Stone, of Blackheath, London. Stone was educated at Harrow School and Pembroke College, Cambridge.

As a 25-year-old, he was an Acting Captain in the 3rd Battalion, The Royal Fusiliers, British Army, attached 17th (Service) Battalion during the First World War. He was awarded the Victoria Cross for his actions on 30 November 1917 in the Cambrai Sector, France, which led to his death.

Citation

Further information

There is a memorial to Walter Napleton Stone in Greenwich Cemetery, south-east London.  About thirty yards in front of the War Memorial is a group of graves of the Stone family. On the largest are the names of Walter's parents, and underneath the inscription:

"also in memory of Lt Col Arthur Stone DSO, 16th Lanc Fusiliers, second son of the above, killed 2 October 1918......; and Capt Walter Napleton Stone VC, 17th Royal Fusiliers, fifth son of the above, killed Bourlon Wood, France, 30 November 1917, presumed buried by the Germans near Moeuvres."

His actual grave has never been located and he is commemorated on the Cambrai Memorial to the Missing.

"W.N. Stone VC DSO MC" is listed on the parish war memorial in the Trinity Chapel of St Mary's Church, Shrewsbury.  There has been no evidence found he lived in Shrewsbury, nor did he receive the Distinguished Service Order or Military Cross.

References

Monuments to Courage (David Harvey, 1999)
The Register of the Victoria Cross (This England, 1997)

1891 births
1917 deaths
Alumni of Pembroke College, Cambridge
British World War I recipients of the Victoria Cross
British Army personnel of World War I
British Army recipients of the Victoria Cross
British military personnel killed in World War I
Graduates of the Royal Military College, Sandhurst
People educated at Harrow School
People from Blackheath, London
Royal Fusiliers officers
Military personnel from London